Augusto Benavides Diez Canseco (1889 – 1975) was a Peruvian politician in the late 1940s. He was the mayor of Lima from 1946 to 1947.

References

1889 births
1975 deaths
Mayors of Lima